Rufo Emiliano Verga (born 21 December 1969 in Legnano) is a retired Italian professional footballer who played as a midfielder.

He represented Italy at the 1992 Summer Olympics.

He had to retire young due to knee problems and now runs a café in Richmond, California.

Honours

Club
Milan
 Serie A champion: 1987–88.

International
Italy U-21
 UEFA European Under-21 Football Championship winner: 1992.

References

External links

1969 births
Living people
People from Legnano
Italian footballers
Footballers from Lombardy
Serie A players
Serie B players
Italy under-21 international footballers
Footballers at the 1992 Summer Olympics
Olympic footballers of Italy
A.C. Milan players
Parma Calcio 1913 players
Bologna F.C. 1909 players
S.S. Lazio players
ACF Fiorentina players
Venezia F.C. players
U.S. Lecce players
Association football defenders
Sportspeople from the Metropolitan City of Milan